Pen-rhiw (sometimes spelt "Penrhiw") is a hamlet in the community of Y Ferwig, Ceredigion, Wales, which is 74.8 miles (120.4 km) from Cardiff and 195.2 miles (314.2 km) from London. Pen-rhiw is represented in the Senedd by Elin Jones (Plaid Cymru) and is part of the Ceredigion constituency in the House of Commons.

References

See also 
 List of Scheduled Roman to modern Monuments in Ceredigion
 List of localities in Wales by population 

Villages in Ceredigion